HMS Growler was a Courser-class gun-brig built for the British Royal Navy at Northfleet and launched in 1797 as GB No. 26; she was renamed Growler on 7 August the same year.    

Lieutenant William Wall commissioned Growler in  May. In August Lieutenant John Hollingsworth replaced Wall. 

Capture: The French privateers Espiègle and Rusé captured Growler off Dungeness on 21 December 1797. Growler was escorting a convoy in the Channel on a moonless night when the two privateers approached. They mistook her for a merchantman, ran close on either side and called on her to surrender. The officer of the watch, taken by surprise, fired a gun. Both privateers immediately came alongside and threw grapnels on to her. The British managed to cut the grapnels on one side the privateer on that side fell away, and fired a broadside before again coming alongside. The privateers sent boarding parties over the side. Lieutenant Hollingsworth was shot and died in the ensuing struggle. The British were then forced to strike.

In 1799 a court martial honourably acquitted Growlers master of her loss. 

French Navy: The French Navy purchased Growler in November 1798 and retained her name.

Recapture: The British found Growler in a very decayed state on 1 August 1809 at Veere on the island of Walcheren at the beginning of the Walcheren Campaign.

Notes, citations, and references
Notes

Citations

References
 
 
  
 

1797 ships
Brigs of the Royal Navy
Captured ships
Brigs of the French Navy